Indian National Students Organization (INSO) is the leading and the fastest growing Students Organization in the North India, especially in the states of Haryana, Chandigarh, Delhi, Rajasthan and Punjab. It is an affiliate of Jannayak Janta Party, and founded by Ajay Singh Chautala.

INSo set a Guinness World Record on 1 December 2013 for maximum number of Eye Donation Pledge made by 10450 individuals at "student conference" organised at Rohtak in Haryana.

See Also
 Akhil Bharatiya Vidyarthi Parishad (ABVP) an affiliate of BJP

References

Student wings of political parties in India
 
1999 establishments in India